Camillo Miola (14 September 1840 – 4 May 1919), also known as Biacca, was an Italian painter, often painting exotic Neo-Pompeian and Orientalist subjects. He also painted history and portraits.

Biography

He was born in Naples, and at the age of 21 became a pupil of the Royal Institute of Fine Arts in that city, under Domenico Morelli. He was a contemporary of another Morelli pupil, Giuseppe Boschetto, who also painted Ancient Roman topics. His first painting exhibited in Naples was Francesco Pusterla and the Astrologer Tommaso Pizzano (a scene from the novel Margherita Pusterla  by Cesare Cantù). He traveled to Paris in 1867 to work in the studio of the Neoclassic sculptor Jean-Louis Ernest Meissonier and met Gérôme. He returned to Naples by 1868. He exhibited in competitions in Naples, Dublin and Paris, entering the work Plauto mugnaio''' (Plautus the Miller, a slave), now found in Naples. He exhibited at Naples Erinna of Lesbos, and at Paris, in 1867, the Bust of Cicero. Other major works are Tarquin and the Sibyl; The Daneids; The Oracle of Delphi, exhibited at Turin in 1880; La sentinella di prua exhibited in Milan in 1881; Fatto di Virginia exhibited at the Mostra of Rome of 1883, an Orazio in villa exhibited in 1877 at Naples; and A Roman and a Barbarian at Paris in 1878. Circe the Sorcerer, Spartacus and the Gladiators; and il Rogo. The princess of Bauffremont commissioned from him a Portrait of the Abate Vito Fornari. In 1876 he painted the Prophet Elias'' for the Cathedral of Altamura. Miola was President of the Artistic Congress of Rome in 1883. He was secretary for five years of the Società Promotrice delle Belle Arti, Director for costumes for the theatrical presentations of Plautus' comedies at the University of Naples, and of celebrations of Pompeian Architecture in 1884.

In 1883, he traveled to Egypt, and the next year, he was invited by the Prince of Sirignano, to travel on his yacht along with the painters Francesco Netti and Eduardo Dalbono, as the Prince visited the east Mediterranean coasts. This led Miola to paint some orientalist canvases.

He was made honorary professor of the Royal Institute of Fine Arts of Naples, he was known for his art criticism, and wrote under the pseudonym of Biacca. In the 1890s, Miola taught drawing in a girls' school and gave lessons in the history of art at Naples's art academy. He died in Naples, aged 78.

See also

List of Orientalist artists
Orientalism

References

19th-century Italian painters
Italian male painters
20th-century Italian painters
1840 births
1919 deaths
Neo-Pompeian painters
Orientalist painters
Painters from Naples
Accademia di Belle Arti di Napoli alumni
19th-century Italian male artists
20th-century Italian male artists